Muko Citizens Gymnasium is an arena in Muko, Kyoto, Japan.

Facilities
Large gymnasium
Small gymnasium
Conference rooms
Training room

References

External links
video

Basketball venues in Japan
Indoor arenas in Japan
Kyoto Hannaryz
Sports venues in Kyoto Prefecture
Mukō